Baringo Central Constituency is an electoral constituency in Kenya. It is one of six constituencies in Baringo County. The constituency was established for the 1966 elections.

Kabarnet is the largest town located within this constituency.

Daniel arap Moi served as the MP for Baringo Central from 1966 until his retirement in 2002. From 1978, he concurrently served as President of Kenya. In the 1963 elections, he won the Baringo North Constituency seat. The current MP is Joshua Kandie of the Maendeleo Chap Chap Party, who has served since August 2017.

Members of Parliament

Wards

References 

Constituencies in Baringo County
Constituencies in Rift Valley Province
1966 establishments in Kenya
Constituencies established in 1966